Robert M. Wald (born  June 29, 1947 in New York City) is an American theoretical physicist and professor at the University of Chicago. He studies general relativity, black holes, and quantum gravity and has written textbooks on these subjects.

Life and education 
He is the son of the mathematician and statistician Abraham Wald. Wald's parents died in a plane crash when he was three years old. He earned his Bachelor's degree from Columbia University in 1968 and his PhD in physics from Princeton University in 1972, under the supervision of John Archibald Wheeler. His doctoral dissertation was titled Nonspherical Gravitational Collapse and Black Hole Uniqueness.

Career and contributions 
Between 1972 and 1974, Robert Wald worked as a research associate in physics at the University of Maryland. He then moved to the University of Chicago, spending two years as a postdoctoral fellow before joining the faculty in 1976. He wanted to move to Chicago in order to work with Robert Geroch and other specialists in gravitation.

In 1977, Wald published a popular-science book titled Space, Time, and Gravity: The Theory of the Big Bang and Black Holes explaining Albert Einstein's general theory of relativity, and its implications in cosmology and astrophysics. The book also gives a survey of what was then ongoing research on gravitational collapse and black holes. This book grew out of a series of lectures Wald gave as part of the Compton Lectures at the University of Chicago in the spring of 1976. The Compton Lectures, given every Spring and Fall quarter, are intended to explain notable advances in the physical sciences to members of the general public.

He published the textbook General Relativity in 1984. Aimed at beginning graduate students, it covers spinors, the variational principles, the initial-value formulation, (exact) gravitational waves, singularities, Penrose diagrams, Hawking radiation, and black-hole thermodynamics.

Wald has taught first-year graduate courses covering a broad range of topics, including classical mechanics, quantum mechanics, statistical mechanics, and electromagnetism. He has also taught courses on general relativity, his specialty, at both introductory and advanced levels. A particularly effective teacher, he received the Graduate Teaching Award from the University of Chicago in 1997.

Wald investigates black holes and their thermodynamics, and gravitational radiation-reaction (or self-force). Due to quantum-mechanical processes, black holes emit particles and therefore have a definite temperature and entropy. Wald has published over 100 research papers on general relativity and quantum field theory in curved spacetime, many of which have been cited by hundreds of subsequent papers. In 1993, he described the Wald entropy of a black hole, which is dependent simply on the area of the event horizon of the black hole.

He organized The Symposium on Black Holes and Relativistic Stars in 1996, in honor of the late Nobel Prize-winning theoretical astrophysicist Subrahmanyan Chandrasekhar. Distinguished speakers of this event included Stephen Hawking, Roger Penrose and Martin Rees. Although the event charged an entrance fee of $100, Wald made sure all University of Chicago students were admitted free of charge. Chandrasekhar founded a research group on general relativity at the University of Chicago, which includes Wald, James Hartle and Robert Geroch. Although Wald and Chandrasekhar never collaborated on any particular research projects, the two developed warm relations.

He became a fellow of the American Physical Society (APS) in 1996 and a member of the National Academy of Sciences in 2001. He received the Einstein Prize from the APS Division of Gravitational Physics in 2017 for "the discovery of the general formula for black hole entropy, and for developing a rigorous formulation of quantum field theory in curved spacetime."

Wald delivered a public lecture at the University of Alabama in October 27, 2015, titled "The Formulation of General Relativity," celebrating the centennial of Einstein's theory. Wald is a member of the LIGO group at the University of Chicago, headed by astrophysicist Daniel Holz. The Laser Interferometry Gravitational-wave Observatory detected gravitational waves for the first time in 2015, one century after Einstein predicted their existence.

Books

See also 

 List of contributors to general relativity
List of books on general relativity
Bekenstein–Hawking entropy

References

External links
Robert M. Wald faculty page at the University of Chicago
Robert Wald research articles cited by INSPIRE-HEP
Robert Wald research articles cited by arXiv
Some properties of Noether charge and a proposal for dynamical black hole entropy, Vivek Iyer and Robert M. Wald, Phys. Rev., D 50 (1994) 846-864 (sample research paper; cited over 250 times)

Recorded Lectures Given by Robert Wald. Perimeter Institute.
Silver Screen - PSD faculty members discuss Hollywood's portrayal of science and scientists. The University of Chicago Magazine. Summer 2015.
The Formulation of General Relativity. Robert Wald. Physics Public Talk. Department of Physics and Astronomy, University of Alabama. October 27, 2015.

1947 births
Living people
American relativity theorists
University of Chicago faculty
Fellows of the American Physical Society
Members of the United States National Academy of Sciences
21st-century American physicists
American people of Romanian-Jewish descent
Jewish American scientists
Jewish physicists
21st-century American Jews
Columbia College (New York) alumni
Princeton University alumni
Quantum gravity physicists